The Malacca International Trade Centre (MITC) is a meetings, incentives, conferencing, exhibitions convention centre situated in Ayer Keroh, Malacca, Malaysia. It was officially launched on June 2003 by Mohammad Ali bin Rustam, the former Chief Minister of Malacca.

Facilities 
 A 13,090 m² Exhibition Hall
 Grand Ballroom
 Auditorium
 Board Room
 VIP Room
 Business Centre
 Surau
 Dining Hall
 Hotels and Apartments
 Bus Terminals and Taxicab service
 Sports Complex

Major Events in MITC 
 Mom & Baby Expo 2015
 Food Fair
 Wedding Fair
 Book Fair
 IT Fair
 Electrical & Home Fair
 Home Decor Fair
 Dharma Talk
 Career Fair
 2022 World Pencak silat Championships: 26–31 July 2022

See also
 List of tourist attractions in Malacca

References

External links

2003 establishments in Malaysia
Ayer Keroh
Buildings and structures in Malacca
Convention centres in Malaysia
Tourist attractions in Malacca